Canada25 was a non-profit and non-partisan organization that sought to facilitate the engagement of young people (primarily aged 20 to 30) in Canada on public policy issues. The organization was founded in 2001 by a small group of recent graduates of Queen's University who recruited other recent graduates. They organized an engagement forum that took place in May 2001 in Muskoka to discuss human capital flight (or 'brain drain'). The results of the forum and other research and consultation formed the basis of Canada25's first report A New Magnetic North: How Canada can Attract and Retain Talent (2001). The report concluded that to retain talented young Canadians, and attract global talent, the Canadian business, research and non-profit sectors, as well Canadian governments, must deliver on "a culture of innovation that begets challenging opportunities, celebrates success, and empowers individuals to fully utilize their skills and ideas" while at the same time creating "strong social orientation and a healthy cultural and physical environment" and ended with a series of recommendations.

The principal author of Canada25's second report was Naheed Nenshi, who would later become the mayor of Calgary. The report, titled Building Up: Making Canada's Cities Magnets for Talent and Engines of Development (2002), was the result of the group's national forum held near Victoria, BC, and their 11 regional roundtable meetings, all held in 2002. The report concludes that a young talented professionals tend to be attracted to cities that offer (1) high density, mixed-use cores, (2) social-cultural diversity and (3) discovery in terms of urban space and innovation.

The group's third report was titled From Middle to Model Power: Recharging Canada's Role in the World (2004). Based on another set of consultations, research and round table discussions, the report's principal author David Eaves concludes that the traditional role of embassies is outdated and should be more like a cultural establishment or community centres for expatriates. The report also identifies Canadian military deployment strategy as erratic and calls for the federal government to establish transparent and predictable intervention criteria, as well as directing the military to establish a specialized expertise in postwar reconstruction.

Canada25's fourth, and what would be their final, published national policy report was Canadians and the Common Good: Building a Civic Nation Through Civic Engagement (2007). With Robin Rix as the principal author, the report was based on research and consultation done for the groups' 2006 national forum, held in Calgary, and 13 roundtable meetings of members, held in various location across North America. The report concluded with 20 policy recommendations around getting young people involved in civic life. Among the recommendations are events that celebrate the coming-of-age of youths (at the legal age of 18), increasing use of the Internet for elections, tax reform regarding contributions to non-profit organization, and revitalize public spaces and civic facilities.

Canada25 also completed dozens of regional projects on issues from healthcare to Kyoto to urban development including: Investing in the Next Alberta (2005); Cooling the Hot Air: Ratification of the Kyoto Protocol (2002); Batir pour l'avenir: A Montreal Renaissance (2002); Ripe With Potential: Vancouver as a Destination For Talent (2002) and Views From Young Talent in Winnipeg (2002).

In 2007, after six years of operations, Canada25 closed its doors due to a lack of a stable funding source.

References

Youth organizations based in Canada